Universal Soldier is a 1992 American military science-fiction action film directed by Roland Emmerich, produced by Allen Shapiro, Craig Baumgarten, and Joel B. Michaels, and written by Richard Rothstein, Christopher Leitch, and Dean Devlin. The film tells the story of Luc Deveraux (Jean-Claude Van Damme), a former U.S. Army soldier who was killed in the Vietnam War in 1969, and returned to life following a secret military project called the "Universal Soldier" program. However, he finds out about his past, though his memory was erased, and escapes alongside a young TV journalist (Ally Walker). Along the way, they have to deal with the return of his archenemy, Sgt. Andrew Scott (Dolph Lundgren), who had lost his sanity in the Vietnam War, and became a psychotic megalomaniac, intent on killing him and leading the Universal Soldiers.

Universal Soldier was released by TriStar Pictures on July 10, 1992. The film has a 35% approval rating on Rotten Tomatoes and grossed $95 million worldwide against its budget of $23 million and spawned a series of films: theatrical sequel Universal Soldier: The Return, alternative direct-to-video sequel Universal Soldier: Regeneration, standalone direct-to-video film Universal Soldier: Day of Reckoning, and two direct-to-TV films, Universal Soldier II: Brothers in Arms and Universal Soldier III: Unfinished Business.

It was the first film on-screen collaboration between Van Damme and Lundgren in the film series, who both later worked together in The Expendables 2 and Black Water, and their voice-roles in Minions: The Rise of Gru.

Plot
In 1969, a U.S. Army team secures a village against North Vietnamese forces. Luc Deveraux discovers members of his squad and villagers murdered. Deveraux's sergeant, Andrew Scott, has gone insane, made a necklace of severed ears, and is holding a young couple hostage. Deveraux tries to reason with Scott, who executes the man and orders Deveraux to shoot the girl to prove his loyalty. Deveraux refuses, and Scott kills the girl with a grenade. After shooting each other to death, Deveraux and Scott's corpses are recovered by a second squad and cryogenically frozen, their disappearance classified as "missing in action".

Deveraux and Scott's corpses, with others, are reanimated decades later and selected for the "Universal Soldier" (UniSol) program, an elite counter-terrorism unit. They are given a neural serum to keep their minds susceptible and their past memories suppressed. Their group is deployed to the Hoover Dam to resolve a hostage situation. The team demonstrates its superior training and physical abilities against the terrorists, such as when UniSol GR76 withstands close-range rifle fire. Deveraux regains memories from his former life upon seeing two hostages that resemble the Vietnamese villagers. Deveraux disobeys commands from the control team and become unresponsive.

In the mobile command center, the UniSols are revealed to be genetically augmented soldiers with enhanced self-healing abilities and superior strength, but they overheat and shut down. Because of the glitch, Woodward, one of the technicians on the project, suggests removing Deveraux from the team, but UniSol commander Colonel Perry refuses. TV journalist Veronica Roberts, who was fired while covering the Hoover Dam incident, tries to get a story on the UniSol project to regain her job. Roberts sneaks onto the base with a cameraman, discovering GR76 immersed in ice, still alive despite normally fatal injuries.

When Roberts is discovered, Deveraux and Scott are ordered to capture her dead or alive. She flees to her cameraman's car, but they crash. Scott coldly murders the cameraman against orders. Deveraux rescues Roberts, and they escape in a UniSol vehicle. To protect the program, Colonel Perry sends the remaining UniSols to find Deveraux and Roberts.

Deveraux and Roberts flee to a motel, where Roberts discovers she has been framed for the murder of her cameraman. Deveraux collapses from overheating and has to take an ice bath. The UniSols completely destroy the motel, but Deveraux and Roberts hide in a bed until they leave. The couple flees in a stolen car to a gas station, where Deveraux has Roberts remove a tracking device from his leg. They set a trap and when the UniSols arrive the gas station explodes. Colonel Perry is ordered to terminate the mission, but Scott's insanity returns, and he kills Perry and all but two doctors. Deveraux and Roberts sneak onto the command center bus and steal UniSol documents. Scott orders the rest of the mindlessly obedient UniSol team to kill Deveraux and Roberts.

Using information from the stolen documents, Roberts contacts Dr. Christopher Gregor. Gregor informs them that the UniSol project was started in the 1960s to develop the perfect soldier. Although they were able to reanimate dead humans, they could not overcome the body's need for cooling. Another major problem is that memories of the last moments of life are greatly amplified; Scott believes he is still in Vietnam fighting insurgents. When Deveraux and Roberts leave the doctor's home, police arrest them. Scott and GR76 ambush the police convoy. After a chase, the police bus and the UniSol truck both drive off a cliff and explode, killing GR76. Deveraux and Roberts head to Deveraux's family farm in Louisiana.

After Deveraux is reunited with his parents, Scott appears and takes the family and Roberts hostage. Scott's use of muscle enhancers enables him to mercilessly beat Deveraux. Roberts escapes, only to be seemingly killed by a grenade thrown by Scott. Deveraux grabs the muscle enhancers Scott used and injects himself. Now evenly matched, Deveraux impales Scott on the spikes of a hay harvester and activates it. Roberts, who survived the explosion, embraces Deveraux.

Cast

Production
In February 1990, Andrew Davis was hired to direct, and he also contributed to the screenplay. He was later replaced by Roland Emmerich, who brought on his creative partner Dean Devlin to rewrite aspects of the script.

Principal photography began in August 1991. Carolco, the company that produced the film, was having financial troubles and hoped that the film's box-office return would keep them afloat.

Release

Marketing
At the 1992 Cannes Film Festival, Van Damme and Lundgren were involved in a verbal altercation that almost turned physical when both men pushed each other, only to be separated. On his website, Lundgren confirmed that it was just a publicity stunt to promote the film. It was the last film that used the multichannel surround-sound format, Cinema Digital Sound.

Alternative ending
The Special Edition DVD release features an alternative ending, which starts shortly after Scott takes Deveraux's family and Roberts hostage. As Deveraux grabs a shotgun in the kitchen, the front door opens, and he sees his mother at the door before Scott shoots her to death. In the final fight between Deveraux and Scott, Deveraux does not use Scott's muscle enhancers. Shortly after grinding Scott to death, Deveraux is shot by his father before Dr. Christopher Gregor and his men appear.

Gregor explains that he used Deveraux to entrap both Scott and him, and that Deveraux was staying with people posing as his parents. He then has his men shoot Deveraux, but before Deveraux dies, the police and Roberts' news crew arrive. The news crew douses Deveraux with a fire extinguisher to stabilize him while Dr. Gregor and his men are arrested. Roberts is given the microphone to cover the arrest, but she loses all composure while on the air, dropping the microphone to comfort Deveraux.

Several days later, Deveraux is reunited with his real parents. The film ends with a eulogy narrated by Roberts, who explains that Deveraux rejected all life-prolonging medication before dying a natural death.

Reception

Box office
Universal Soldier opened in theaters on July 10, 1992 where it grossed $10,057,084 from 1916 theaters with a $5,249 per screen average. It opened and peaked at number two, behind A League of Their Owns second weekend. Grossing $36,299,898 in the US and Canada and $59 million internationally ($44 million via TriStar), for a worldwide gross of $95 million.

Critical response
Mainstream critics dismissed it as a Terminator 2 clone, or as a typical, mindless action film.   Audiences polled by CinemaScore gave the film an average grade of "B" on an A+ to F scale.

In a retrospective review, Drew Taylor from IndieWire said: "This movie rules. The introduction of the Emmerich/Devlin double-team, this high concept, moderately budgeted sci-fi action movie is a bouillabaisse of clichés that somehow manages to be a charming, funny, often positively thrilling B-grade treat".

Other media

Comics
NOW Comics published a three-part comic miniseries based on the movie, running from September to November 1992. The adaptation was written by Clint McElroy.

Video game
During conversion of the video game Turrican 2 to the Sega Genesis, the publisher, Accolade, decided to cash in on the hype surrounding the film and rebrand the game as a tie-in. The spaceship levels from the original were replaced with "platforming" levels set in a jungle, and the player sprite and some enemies were changed to look more human. The resulting product received mostly negative reviews compared to the critically acclaimed home-computer release. A version of the game for the Game Boy was also released, while a Super Nintendo Entertainment System port was developed, but never released.

Franchise

Sequels
The two direct-to-TV sequels, Universal Soldier II: Brothers in Arms and Universal Soldier III: Unfinished Business were released in 1998, with Matt Battaglia cast as the titular character. A theatrical sequel Universal Soldier: The Return (which ignores the two television sequels) was released in 1999, with Van Damme reprising the role and Michael Jai White was cast as another role for the film, and the alternative sequels, Universal Soldier: Regeneration and Universal Soldier: Day of Reckoning, were released in 2009 and 2012, with Van Damme and Lundgren reprising their roles from the first film, ignoring the events of The Return.

Reboot
A reboot was in development and Richard Wenk was set to write the film as of October 2018, which will focus on one resurrected soldier.

Television series
In October 2011, writer Damien Kindler was set to write a TV series of the same name for FremantleMedia North America with producers from the original film Allen Shapiro and Craig Baumgarten attached to the project.

References

External links

 
 
 
 

1992 films
1990s science fiction action films
American science fiction action films
1990s English-language films
Films set in 1969
Films set in Arizona
Films set in Louisiana
Films set in Nevada
Films set in Vietnam
Films shot in Nevada
Martial arts science fiction films
Universal Soldier (film series)
Carolco Pictures films
Centropolis Entertainment films
TriStar Pictures films
Films directed by Roland Emmerich
Military science fiction films
Films about the United States Army
Films scored by Christopher Franke
Vietnam War films
Resurrection in film
1990s American films